The King's Cup is Bahrain's premier knockout tournament in men's football. 

The national cup has had many different names over the years. Emir Cup (1952–59 & 1978–2002), Federation Cup (1960–77) and King's Cup (2003–present).

Previous winners
Previous winners are: 
1952 : Muharraq Club
1953 : Muharraq Club
1954 : Muharraq Club
unknown winner between 1955 and 1957
1958 : Muharraq Club
1959 : Muharraq Club
1960 : Al Nusoor Manama 1–0 Muharraq Club
1961 : Muharraq Club 4–1 Al Nusoor
1962 : Muharraq Club 7–1 Al Nahda
1963 : Muharraq Club 2–0 Bahrain Riffa
1964 : Muharraq Club 4–2 Al Nusoor Manama
1965 : no cup
1966 : Muharraq Club 5–0 Taj
1967 : Muharraq Club 1–0 Al Arabi
1968 : Al Nusoor Manama 2–1 Bahrain Riffa
1969 : Al Arabi 4–0 Al Tursana
1970 : Bahrain Club 5–2 Al Nusoor Manama
1971 : Bahrain Club 4–2 Al Arabi
1972 : Muharraq Club 2–0 Bahrain Club
1973 : Bahrain Riffa 2–2 (8 – 7) Bahrain Club
1974 : Muharraq Club 3–2 Al Nusoor Manama
1975 : Muharraq Club 5–1 Bahrain Club
1976 : Al Hala 1–0 Bahrain Club
1977 : Al Nusoor Manama 1–0 Muharraq Club
1978 : Muharraq Club 1–0 Al Wahda
1979 : Muharraq Club 1–0 Al Ahly Manama
1980 : Al Hala 0–0 (4 – 2) East Riffa Club
1981 : Al Hala 2–2 (5 – 4) Bahrain Club
1982 : Al Ahly Manama 2–0 Bahrain Riffa
1983 : Muharraq Club 2–0 Bahrain Riffa
1984 : Muharraq Club 2–0 Bahrain Club
1985 : Bahrain Riffa 1–1 (4 – 1) Bahrain Club
1986 : Bahrain Riffa 1–0 East Riffa Club
1987 : Al Ahly Manama 1–0 Al Wahda
1988 : Al Wahda 1–0 Al Ahly Manama
1989 : Muharraq Club 1–0 East Riffa Club
1990 : Muharraq Club
1991 : Al Ahly Manama
1992 : Al Wahda
1993 : Muharraq Club
1994 : Al Wahda
1995 : Muharraq Club
1996 : Muharraq Club (4 – 3) Bahrain Club
1997 : Muharraq Club 2–1 East Riffa Club
1998 : Bahrain Riffa 2–1 Budaiya
1999 : East Riffa Club 1–0 Al Hala
2000 : East Riffa Club 3–1 Qadisiya
2001 : Al Ahly Manama 1–0 Essa Town
2002 : Muharraq Club 0–0 (4 – 2) Al Ahly Manama
2003 : Al Ahly Manama 2–1 Muharraq Club
2004 : Al-Shabab 2–1 Busaiteen
2005 : Muharraq Club 1–0 (a.p.) Al-Shabab
2006 : Al-Najma 1–0 Al Ahly Manama
2007 : Al-Najma 2–0 Al Hala
2008 : Muharraq Club 2–0 Al-Najma
2009 : Muharraq Club 1–1 (9–8 pens) Riffa SC
2010 : Riffa SC 4–0 Busaiteen Club
2011 : Muharraq Club 3–0 Busaiteen Club
2012 : Muharraq Club 3–1 Riffa SC
2013 : Muharraq Club 2–2 (aet) (4–3 pens) Riffa SC
2014 : East Riffa SCC 2–1 (aet) Busaiteen Club
2015 : Al-Hidd 2–0 Busaiteen Club
2015–16 : Muharraq Club 3–1 Riffa SC
2016–17 : Manama SC 2–1 Muharraq Club
2017–18 : Al-Najma 1–1 (aet) (5–4 pens) Muharraq Club
2018–19 : Riffa SC 2–1 (aet) Al-Hidd
2019–20 : Muharraq Club 1–0 Al-Hidd
2020–21 : Riffa SC 2–0 Al Ahly Manama
2021–22 : Al-Khaldiya SC 0–0 (aet) (4–3 pens) East Riffa SCC

Top–performing clubs

References

External links
Soccerway
flashscore

 

 
Football cup competitions in Bahrain
National association football cups
Recurring sporting events established in 1952